Dionisio Aguilar González (died 2 March 2002) was a Mexican gymnast. He competed in the 1948 Summer Olympics.

References

External links

Year of birth missing
2002 deaths
Gymnasts at the 1948 Summer Olympics
Mexican male artistic gymnasts
Olympic gymnasts of Mexico
20th-century Mexican people